Ralph Beattie Blacket  (July 11, 1919 – 2010) was an Australian Foundation Professor of Medicine at the University of New South Wales in Australia.  He was responsible for important research on beriberi and heart disease.

Early life and education

Blacket graduated from Sydney Boys High School in 1935. He attended Sydney University, graduating in medicine in 1941, and won the University medal.

Career

During World War II, Blacket joined the Royal Australian Army Medical Corps in New Guinea, and served in 1942 with the 45 New Guinea 9th Division, earning the rank of Major.

After the war Blacket completed his residency at the Royal Prince Alfred Hospital. He was a Hallstrom Fellow in Cardiology, and studied at Sydney University while lecturing part-time, graduating with a Doctor of Medicine in 1957.  He researched the disease Beriberi, and his thesis won the Peter Bancroft Prize.  He wrote a book about this called The Beri-beri Heart.

Blacket worked as a Professor of Medicine at the University of New South Wales, and as Director of Medicine at two hospitals.  He studied the causes of heart disease, and proposed that cholesterol was a factor in heart disease, and was a co-founder of The National Heart Foundation of Australia.

Blanket participated in the Bunbury life study of clinical management of large hospitals, worked on medical advisory committees and published about 120 papers in medical journals.

Blacket was appointed an Officer of the Order of Australia in 1984 for his contributions to medicine.

IN 1999 Blacket was presented with an honorary degree by the University of New South Wales.

Personal
Blacket was married to Margaret McIlrath  and the couple had five children.

References

External links

1919 births
2010 deaths
Australian medical researchers
Officers of the Order of Australia
Australian military personnel of World War II
Australian expatriates in Papua New Guinea
University of Sydney alumni
Academic staff of the University of New South Wales